Brown Township is one of eleven townships in Montgomery County, Indiana, United States. As of the 2010 census, its population was 1,719 and it contained 739 housing units.

Geography

Cities, towns, villages
 New Market (southwest corner)
 Waveland

Unincorporated towns
 Browns Valley at 
 Sycamore Ford at 
(This list is based on USGS data and may include former settlements.)

Cemeteries
The township contains these eight cemeteries: Indian Creek, Indian Creek Hill, Jones, Lydick, Maple Ridge, Old Hickory, Old Union and Wasson.

Major highways
  Indiana State Road 47

Airports and landing strips
 Shades State Park Airport

Landmarks
 Lake Waveland Park
 Shades State Park (southeast three-quarters)

Education
 South Montgomery Community School Corporation

Brown Township is served by the Waveland-Brown Township Public Library.

Political districts
 Indiana's 4th congressional district
 State House District 28
 State Senate District 23

References
 
 United States Census Bureau 2008 TIGER/Line Shapefiles
 IndianaMap

External links
 Indiana Township Association
 United Township Association of Indiana
 City-Data.com page for Brown Township

Townships in Montgomery County, Indiana
Townships in Indiana